The 18th Annual CableACE Awards were held on November 16, 1996. Below are the nominees and the winners from that ceremony in the major categories.

Winners and nominees 
Winners in bold.

Movie or Miniseries 
 Truman (HBO)
 The Late Shift (HBO)
 Sophie and the Moonhanger (Lifetime)
 Soul of the Game (HBO)
 The Tuskegee Airmen (HBO)

Dramatic Series 
 The Outer Limits (Showtime)
 Avonlea (Disney Channel)
 Strangers (HBO)

Comedy Series 
 The Larry Sanders Show (HBO)
 Exit 57 (Comedy Central)
 Mystery Science Theater 3000 (Comedy Central)

Actor in a Movie or Miniseries 
 Gary Sinise – Truman (HBO)
 Robbie Coltrane – Cracker (Episode: "Brotherly Love") (A&E)
 Laurence Fishburne – The Tuskegee Airmen (HBO)
 Carl Lumbly – Nightjohn (Disney Channel)
 Courtney B. Vance – The Affair (HBO)

Actress in a Movie or Miniseries 
 Sela Ward – Almost Golden: The Jessica Savitch Story (Lifetime)
 Anne Bancroft – Homecoming (Showtime)
 Kerry Fox – The Affair (HBO)
 Lela Rochon – Mr. and Mrs. Loving (Showtime)
 Cicely Tyson – The Road to Galveston (USA)

Supporting Actor in a Movie or Miniseries 
 Tom Hulce – The Heidi Chronicles (TNT)
 Jason Bernard – Sophie and the Moonhanger (Lifetime)
 Dennis Boutsikaris – Chasing the Dragon (Lifetime)
 Andre Braugher – The Tuskegee Airmen (HBO)
 Stephen Root – The Road to Galveston (USA)

Supporting Actress in a Movie or Miniseries 
 Amanda Plummer – The Right to Remain Silent (Showtime)
 Christine Lahti – The Four Diamonds (Disney Channel)
 Laura San Giacomo – The Right to Remain Silent (Showtime)
 Alison Steadman – Pride and Prejudice (A&E)
 Shelley Winters – Mrs. Munck (Showtime)

Actor in a Dramatic Special or Series 
 Danny Glover – America's Dream (Episode: "Long Black Song") (HBO)
 Ben Cross – Poltergeist: The Legacy (Episode: "The Substitute") (Showtime)
 Mark Harmon – Strangers (Episode: "The Visit") (HBO)
 Michael Shulman – Lifestories: Families in Crisis (Episode: "Someone Had to be Benny") (HBO)
 Wesley Snipes – America's Dream (Episode: "The Boy Who Painted Christ Black") (HBO)

Actress in a Dramatic Special or Series 
 Donna Murphy – Lifestories: Families in Crisis (Episode: "Someone Had to be Benny") (HBO)
 Tina Lifford – America's Dream (Episode: "Long Black Song") (HBO)
 Cherie Lunghi – Strangers (Episode: "The One You Love") (HBO)
 Amanda Plummer – The Outer Limits (Episode: "A Stitch in Time") (Showtime)
 Maureen Stapleton – Avonlea (Episode: "What a Tangled Web We Weave") (Disney Channel)

Actor in a Comedy Series 
 Garry Shandling – The Larry Sanders Show (HBO)
 Brian Benben – Dream On (HBO)
 Michael McKean – Dream On (HBO)
 Jeffrey Tambor – The Larry Sanders Show (HBO)
 Rip Torn – The Larry Sanders Show (HBO)

Actress in a Comedy Series 
 Tracey Ullman – Tracey Takes On... (HBO)
 Denny Dillon – Dream On (HBO)
 Janeane Garofalo – The Larry Sanders Show (HBO)
 Penny Johnson – The Larry Sanders Show (HBO)
 Wendie Malick – Dream On (HBO)

Children's Special or Series – 6 and Younger 
 The World of Peter Rabbit and Friends (Episode: "The Tale Of The Flopsy Bunnies & Mrs. Tittlemouse") (The Family Channel)
 A Chanukah Mitzvah (Jewish TV Network)
 Allegra's Window (Nickelodeon)
 Gullah Gullah Island (Nickelodeon)
 Little Bear (Nickelodeon)

Children's Series – 7 and Older 
 The Composers' Specials (HBO)
 Are You Afraid of the Dark? (Nickelodeon)
 Flash Forward (Disney Channel)
 Space Cases (Nickelodeon)
 The Secret World of Alex Mack (Nickelodeon)

Children's Special – 7 and Older 
 Nickelodeon Sports Theater with Shaquille O'Neal (Episode: "4 Points") (Nickelodeon)
 Family Video Diaries (Episode: "Before You Go: A Daughter's Diary") (HBO)
 Johnny & Clyde (Showtime)
 Nick News (Episode: "The Body Trap") (Nickelodeon)
 The Little Riders (Disney Channel)

Children's Educational or Informational Special or Series 
 Nick News (Nickelodeon)
 Justice Factory (Court TV)
 Teen Summit (Episode: "Living on the Street . . . On the Real") (BET)
 The Big Help Stories (Nickelodeon)

Animated Programming Special or Series 
 Duckman (USA)
 Courage the Cowardly Dog (Episode: "The Chicken from Outer Space") (Cartoon Network)
 Dr. Katz, Professional Therapist (Comedy Central)
 Ren & Stimpy (Nickelodeon)
 Rocko's Modern Life (Nickelodeon)

Comedy Special 
 20 Years of Comedy on HBO (HBO)
 HBO Comedy Hour (Episode: "Hazelle!") (HBO)
 Mr. Show (HBO)

Variety Special or Series 
 Tracey Takes On... (HBO)
 Dennis Miller Live (HBO)
 Lifetime Applauds (Episode: "The Fight Against Breast Cancer") (Lifetime)
 Midnight Mac Starring Bernie Mac (HBO)

Music Special or Series 
 The South Bank Show (Episode: "Wynton Marsalis") (Bravo)
 The Concert for the Rock and Roll Hall of Fame (HBO)
 VH1 Duets (VH1)
 VH1 Honors (VH1)
 VH1 Storytellers (VH1)

Documentary Special 
 Survivors of the Holocaust (TBS)
 Investigative Reports (Episode: "Kamikaze") (A&E)
 Letting Go: A Hospice Journey (HBO)
 Paradise Lost: The Child Murders at Robin Hood Hills (HBO)
 Rain of Ruin (History)

Documentary Series 
 The Revolutionary War (TLC)
 Biography (A&E)
 Crime Science (A&E)
 Lost & Found (FX)
 Mysteries of the Bible (A&E)

Talk Show Series 
 Politically Incorrect with Bill Maher (Comedy Central)
 Charles Grodin (CNBC)
 Larry King Live (CNN)
 Reflections on the Silver Screen (AMC)
 The Howard Stern Show (E!)

Program Interviewer 
 Roy Firestone – Up Close Primetime (ESPN)
 Larry King – Larry King Live (CNN)
 Howard Stern – The Howard Stern Show (E!)
 Mary Tillotson – CNN and Company (CNN)

News Special or Series 
 Investigative Reports (Episode: "Seized by the Law") (A&E)
 Chernobyl: Legacy of a Meltdown (CNN)
 Investigative Reports (Episode: "Danger on the Rails") (A&E)
 Return to the Hot Zone (CNN)
 War on the Cocaine Cartel (CNN)

Newscaster 
 Bernard Shaw and Judy Woodruff – Inside Politics (CNN)
 Joie Chen and Miles O'Brien – CNN Saturday/Sunday Morning News (CNN)
 Leon Harris and Donna Kelley – CNN Morning News (CNN)

Sports News Series 
 Sports Tonight (CNN)
 Baseball Tonight (ESPN)
 NFL Game Day (ESPN)
 NFL Prime Monday (ESPN)
 SportsCenter (ESPN)

Sports Information Series 
 Real Sports with Bryant Gumbel (HBO)
 Outside the Lines (ESPN)
 Peak Performance (TLC)
 The Sports Reporters (ESPN)
 Up Close Primetime (ESPN)

Sports Host 
 Chris Berman – Baseball Tonight, NFL Halftime, and SportsCenter (ESPN)
 Verne Lundquist (TBS)
 Keith Olbermann (ESPN)
 Bob Page (Madison Square Garden)
 Al Trautwig (Madison Square Garden)

Performing Arts Special or Series 
 B.B. King: The Blues Summit (A&E)
 My Life With Handel (Ovation)
 The South Bank Show (Episode: "Elaine Paige") (Bravo)
 The South Bank Show (Episode: "Luciano Pavarotti") (Bravo)
 Still/Here (Ovation)

References 

18th CableACE Awards